Joculator brevis is a species of minute sea snail, a marine gastropod mollusc in the family Cerithiopsidae. This species was described by Cecalupo and Perugia in 2012.

References

 Cecalupo A. & Perugia I. (2012) Family Cerithiopsidae H. Adams & A. Adams, 1853 in the central Philippines (Caenogastropoda: Triphoroidea). Quaderni della Civica Stazione Idrobiologica di Milano 30: 1-262. [Stated date: "December 2011"; published January 2012]

External links
 MNHN, Paris: holotype

Gastropods described in 2012
brevis